Uilliam Ó Cormacáina, Archbishop of Tuam 5 May 1386 – 1393.

Ó Cormacáin was a member of an ecclesiastical family based in Síol Anmchadha, in what is now south-east County Galway. Muirchertach Ua Carmacáin (died 1203) served as Bishop of Clonfert, as did Uilliam after becoming Archbishop.

See also
 Henry Ó Cormacáin

References

 The Surnames of Ireland, Edward MacLysaght, 1978.

External links
 http://www.ucc.ie/celt/published/T100005C/
 https://archive.org/stream/fastiecclesiaehi04cottuoft#page/n17/mode/2up
 http://www.irishtimes.com/ancestor/surname/index.cfm?fuseaction=Go.&UserID=

Archbishops of Tuam
People from County Galway
Medieval Gaels from Ireland
14th-century Roman Catholic bishops in Ireland
Bishops of Clonfert

xi